Absa Bank Uganda Limited, formerly known as Barclays Bank of Uganda Limited, is a commercial bank in Uganda. It is licensed by the Bank of Uganda, the central bank and national banking regulator. The bank is a subsidiary of Absa Group Limited, a financial services conglomerate, based in South Africa, with banking subsidiaries in 12 African countries and representative offices in two other African countries. Absa Bank Group, whose shares trade on the JSE Limited, was reported to have total assets in excess of US$91 billion, as of October 2019.

Overview
The bank is primarily involved in meeting the banking needs of individuals, small and medium-sized businesses (SMEs), and large corporations. Before 2006, the bank focused on meeting the banking needs of only large corporations and high-net-worth individuals. That focus was loosened to include SMEs and regular customers. As of December 2021, the bank's total assets were valued at UGX:3.9 trillion (US$1.1 billion), with shareholders' equity of UGX:521.956 billion (US$148 million). That year, the bank's after-tax profit was USh:110 billion (US$31.2 million). As of 31 December 2019, Absa Bank Uganda was the third-largest commercial bank in the country, by assets.

History
The bank opened in 1927, with two branches in the capital city, Kampala, and one in Jinja, the country's second-largest commercial centre, at that time. In 1969, the bank acquired the Ugandan business of the Commercial Bank of Africa. In February 2007, the bank completed its acquisition of Nile Bank Uganda Limited, strengthening its presence in the country.

Ownership
In 1969, the bank's stock was 51 percent held by Barclays and 49 percent held by the government of Uganda. By 2001, the bank had become a wholly owned subsidiary of Barclays. Since March 2016, the bank has been wholly owned by the Barclays Africa Group. With the re-branding of Barclays Africa Group, in 2018, Absa Bank Uganda is a 100 percent subsidiary of Absa Group Limited.

Branch network 
The bank's headquarters is at 2 Hannington Road, on Nakasero Hill, in Kampala. , the bank maintained branches at the following locations:

Name change
Beginning in August 2019, Barclays Bank of Uganda began re-branding to Absa Bank Uganda Limited. The process concluded on 11 November 2019, when the legal and business names of the bank changed to Absa Bank Uganda Limited.

Governance
The bank is governed by a board of directors. The chairman of the board is one of the non-executive directors. As of March 2020, the Acting Chairperson was Nadine Byarugaba. Effective 1 April 2020 Mumba Kalifungwa began serving as the substantive Managing Director and CEO.

The former managing director is Mian Nazim Mahmood. He was appointed in July 2019, as Interim CEO, while a substantive chief executive was being sought. Nazim holds a Bachelor of Business Administration degree, awarded by the University of Massachusetts, Amherst and a Master of Business Administration in Finance from Bentley College, in Waltham, Massachusetts, all in the United States. Before that Rakesh Jha served in that position. He holds an MBA in Marketing gained from IMED and a Bachelor of Arts (BA) degree gained from the University of Mumbai. Immediately prior to his appointment as managing director, Jha was managing director of Barclays Bank Seychelles.

As of October 2021, the members of the board are as listed in the table below.

Innovation
In December 2021, Absa Bank Uganda was the first financial institution in the country to introduce ATM machines capable of accepting and dispensing cash, using smart mobile phones, without the presence of the traditional ATM card. The Absa Banking App generates a QR Code, which the customer scans on to the ATM screen and then allows the execution of the desired transaction.

See also

 Banking in Uganda
 List of banks in Uganda
 Absa Group Limited
 Asset allocation among commercial banks in Uganda

References

External links
 Exclusive: Uganda’s Largest Banks By Assets Revealed As at 24 May 2017.
 BoU hands license to Absa Uganda to formalise name change As of 11 November 2019.

Banks of Uganda
Uganda
Absa Group Limited
Banks established in 1927
1927 establishments in Uganda
1927 establishments in the British Empire
Companies based in Kampala